Andělská Hora is a town in Bruntál District in the Moravian-Silesian Region of the Czech Republic. It has about 400 inhabitants.

Administrative parts
The village of Pustá Rudná is an administrative part of Andělská Hora.

Geography
It lies in the Hrubý Jeseník mountain range.

History
Andělská Hora was founded in 1540 as a mining town. In 1553 it received a mining register and in 1556 it was furnished with all necessary permissions for mining by Jan the Elder of Vrbno and Bruntál. After the Thirty Years' War the town was given to the Teutonic Order which owned it until 1639.

According to the Austrian census of 1910 the village had 1,789 inhabitants, 1,767 (99.7%) were German-speaking. Most populous religious group were Roman Catholics with 1,761 (98.4%).

Sights

A wooden church existed here already in 1500, but was burned down during the Thirty Years' War. The Church of the Nativity of the Virgin Mary was built in the early Baroque style in 1672 and was reconstructed in 1734, after it was damaged by the fire in 1732. It is the landmark of the village. In front of the church there is a baroque statue of Saint John of Nepomuk from 1724.

On the town square there is an Empire style sandstone stone cross from 1815, and several late Baroque houses from the second half of the 18th century.

On the hill called Anenský vrch there is the pilgrimage Church of Saint Anne. It was originally a wooden chapel built in 1694–⁠1696. The current church was built in 1766–1772. A linden alley with Stations of the Cross leads to the church.

Notable people
Albert Schindler (1805–1861), Austrian Biedermeier painter and engraver
Eduard Schön (1825–1879), Silesian-Austrian composer
Moritz Jursitzky (1861–1936), Silesian-Austrian writer

Twin towns – sister cities

Andělská Hora is twinned with:
 Reńska Wieś, Poland

References

External links

 

Populated places established in 1540
Villages in Bruntál District